The Cely Letters are a collection of family correspondence written in the 15th century, which describe the lives and business activities of a family of London wool merchants. Key members were Richard Cely and his wife Agnes and their sons Robert, Richard, and George. This collection is one of the few surviving letter collections from the 15th century, along with the Paston Letters and the Stonor Letters. While the Paston Letters cover a period spanning over 3/4 of a century, the Cely Letters cover a much shorter period of time between 1472 and 1488. The Cely letters were preserved only because they were used as evidence in a lawsuit. The Cely Letters are primary sources of information about the English economy and English society at the end of the Wars of the Roses. Only one thing that was known about the wives from the letters is that they would take care of the house and land the husbands own since they would be away

See also 

 Plumpton Correspondence

Notes

Bibliography 
 Hanham, Alison. "A fifteenth-century merchant family." History Today (Dec 1963) 13#12 pp 821–829

Wars of the Roses
Medieval letter collections
15th century in England
Medieval historical texts
15th-century documents